Amba Prasad is an Indian politician from Jharkhand and a member of the Indian National Congress. She has been elected as a member of the Legislative Assembly of Jharkhand from Barkagaon in 2019 Jharkhand Assembly Election . She is the youngest legislator in the Jharkhand Legislative Assembly 2019.

Early life
An example of Congress “parivarvad” the MLA is the daughter of former MLA of Barkagaon Yogendra Sao. Her mother Nimala Devi was also an MLA from Barkagaon. She studied at a missionary school - Carmel Convent, in New Delhi in 2007 and did her Intermediate from DAV public school, Hazaribagh in 2009. She passed PGDM from Xavier institute of School of Social Studies in 2014. She completed LLB from Vinoba Bhabe University Hazaribagh in 2017.

References

Indian National Congress politicians from Jharkhand
Living people
Jharkhand politicians
Year of birth missing (living people)